The Billboard Music Award for Top Country Artist recognizes the most successful country artists on the Billboard Charts over the past year. Garth Brooks and Taylor Swift has won the most awards with three each. Luke Bryan is the only artist to be nominated for it every year it was awarded until 2015 and 2016. Dixie Chicks became the first group to win it in the 1999 Billboard Music Awards.

Winners and nominees

Most wins and nominations

The following individuals received two or more Top Country Artist Awards:

The following individuals received two or more Top Country Artist nominations:

References

Billboard awards